Audrina Cathleen Patridge is an American television personality, model and actress. In 2006, she rose to prominence after being cast in the reality television series The Hills, which chronicled the personal and professional lives of Patridge and friends Lauren Conrad, Heidi Montag and Whitney Port. During its production, she was cast in positions with Quixote Studios and Epic Records.

Later that year, Patridge competed on the 11th season of the American version of Dancing with the Stars, and finished in seventh place. In 2011, she was commissioned her own television series, Audrina, which documented the lives of her immediate family and her. Patridge entered the film industry with roles in the horror film Sorority Row (2009) and direct-to-DVD film, Into the Blue 2: The Reef (2011), and was a supporting character in Honey 2 (2011). In 2014 and 2015, Patridge hosted NBC's late-night travel show 1st Look.

Life and career

1985–2004: Early life
Audrina Cathleen Patridge was born in Los Angeles, California, the daughter of Lynn (née Clelland) and Mark Patridge. She is of English, German, Belgian, Italian and Polish descent, and has three younger siblings: Casey; Mark Jr.; and Samantha. Patridge grew up in Yorba Linda, California.

2005–2010: The Hills and Dancing with the Stars
In 2005, MTV developed the reality television series The Hills as the spin-off of Laguna Beach: The Real Orange County. It originally chronicled the lives of Lauren Conrad, who appeared on its predecessor, her housemate Heidi Montag, and friends Whitney Port and Patridge. During production of the first season, producers cast her in a position with Quixote Studios. The following season, Patridge was cast with Epic Records. Later in the season, Montag ended her friendship with Patridge, though the women later reconciled. After Montag moved in with Spencer Pratt, Patridge and Lo Bosworth later became roommates with Conrad. During the third season, Patridge resumed an on-again/off-again relationship with boyfriend Justin Brescia, whom Bosworth jokingly nicknamed "Justin Bobby". Their turbulent relationship carried through each subsequent season.

On May 28, 2009, she confirmed during an interview on On Air with Ryan Seacrest that she was leaving The Hills to star in her own reality program documenting her life outside The Hills. Her final episode of the series was supposed to be on December 1, 2009. However, she later signed on for the series's sixth (and final) season while her new series, produced by Mark Burnett, set to air on MTV in mid-2010, was put on hold due to The Hills. 

Patridge launched her Hollywood career appearing on the reality show The Hills and then landed a minor role in Into the Blue 2: The Reef. The movie was released straight-to-DVD on April 21, 2009. Patridge has made appearances on Mad TV and Do Not Disturb.

In March 2008, nude photos of Patridge were illegally published online. "They were taken when I was just out of high school and beginning to model," Patridge has explained. "I was naïve, overly trusting of people, and inexperienced."

In August 2008, she was cast as Megan in Sorority Row; production was carried out from October 2008 to early 2009, and the film was released on September 11, 2009. In August 2008, Patridge purchased a house in Los Angeles' Hollywood Dell neighborhood. On February 22, 2009, Patridge's home was burgled by two members of the Bling Ring. She appeared in an ad for PETA, encouraging people to adopt rather than buy pets.

Patridge appeared in Carl's Jr. commercials during 2009, 2010, and 2012. She denied rumors that she would play the part based on her former Hills co-star Lauren Conrad in the film version of L.A. Candy based on the book by Conrad.

During a live press conference on August 31, 2010, Patridge was confirmed to be a contestant on the eleventh season of ABC's Dancing with the Stars. Her professional partner was Tony Dovolani. Her first dance was the Cha-Cha-Cha and her second was the Quickstep. They were the sixth couple to be eliminated, finishing in seventh place.

She also ranked at #16 in FHM's 100 Sexiest Women poll in 2010.

2011–2018: Audrina and other series
In October 2010, Patridge announced that she would star in Audrina, an upcoming VH1 reality series following her life after The Hills. The series premiered on April 17, 2011, with disappointing ratings, and it was canceled after only one season. She had a cameo role in the 2011 film Take Me Home Tonight.

In January 2011, she signed on to star in the YOBI.tv "Dream Maker" webseries. Following the end of her career in reality TV, Patridge continued to pursue acting, and was cast in a part in Scary Movie 5; however her scenes were cut from the finished film due to the scene being too risqué for the PG-13 movie.

Patridge hosted the NBC late-night travel series 1st Look in 2014 and 2015.

2019–present: The Hills: New Beginnings

At the 2018 MTV Video Music Awards, MTV announced a reboot of The Hills entitled The Hills: New Beginnings, slated to premiere in 2019. Patridge was announced as part of the cast of the new series. In July 2022, Patridge launched a podcast with her former The Hills co-stars Brody Jenner and Frankie Delgado called, Was It Real? The Hills Rewatch, revisiting the show. That same year, Patridge released her memoir entitled Choices.

Personal life
Patridge was dating Corey Bohan, a motorcycle rider and professional BMX dirt bike rider, since 2008, and on November 20, 2015, Bohan proposed after getting her parents' permission and she accepted.  Patridge gave birth to daughter Kirra Max on June 24, 2016. The couple married on November 5, 2016. On September 20, 2017, Patridge filed for divorce from Bohan and filed a restraining order against him. On December 20, 2018, the divorce was finalized. On February 14, 2023, Patridge announced on her Instagram that her niece Sadie Raine Loza had died one week after her 15th birthday.

Filmography

Television

Film

References

External links

Living people
21st-century American actresses
Actresses from Hollywood, Los Angeles
Actresses from Orange County, California
American film actresses
American people of Belgian descent
American people of German descent
American people of English descent
American people of Italian descent
American people of Polish descent
American television actresses
Participants in American reality television series
People from Yorba Linda, California
The Hills (TV series)
Year of birth missing (living people)